Towers, operating as Bonimart in Quebec, was a Canadian discount department store chain owned by the Oshawa Group, a now-defunct grocery retailer and distributor.

History

Towers Marts began as a New York-based chain. The first Canadian store was opened in November 1960 in Scarborough, Toronto (at the corner of Lawrence Ave. East and Midland Ave.). After the chain went bankrupt in 1963, a group of Towers concessionaires, incorporated as Allied Towers Merchants Ltd., purchased the 13 Canadian stores and began operating as a Canada-only chain.

In Quebec, the chain traded as Towers in the 1960s but the name was changed  to Bonimart in April 1971, starting with the stores in the Greater Montreal, as part of a program by owner Oshawa Group to promote the French character among its subsidiaries in the province.

Each selling department within a Towers store was operated as a licensed concession. Some Towers/Bonimart stores offered services such as restaurants, photo labs, and pharmacies within the store. Some stores were also paired with an IGA or Food City grocery store.

In October 1990, Towers/Bonimart's 51 stores were purchased by Hudson's Bay Company which intended to merge them with its Zellers subsidiary. One store was transferred to The Bay and four others were going to be sold or closed. The transaction was met with strong opposition from the New York-based F. W. Woolworth Company (owner of the Woolco stores in Canada) which also wanted to purchase the chain.

In April 1991, 47 of the Towers/Bonimart stores were rebranded into the Zellers banner. The remaining stores held closeout sales under their original name, some of them lasting until the fall of 1991. While ownership to the Towers name is unclear, the Bonimart trademark is the property of Sobeys, the successor of  the Oshawa Group.

However, Zellers sold most of its former Towers stores to Target Canada for relaunch in 2013. Target Canada ceased operations in 2015 due to bankruptcy and some of the stores that were once Towers were resold to Walmart Canada.

Slogans

 "At Towers everything connects - the last day of one sale is the first of the next".
 "Extra Special For Your Family--Towers."
 "You made us part of your family at Towers."
 "Towers. Your family's extra special store."
 "At Towers, we've got the right idea!"

Mascot

Towers' mascot was an animated squirrel named Sparky. At the time of the Zellers buyout, print ads featured Sparky arm-in-arm with Zellers' bear mascot, Zeddy.

Locations

Ontario: other than GTA

 Barrie (450 Bayfield Street, moved to the Bayfield Mall, closed 1990/1991)
 Belleville
 Bracebridge (505 Muskoka Rd #118W)
 Brantford
 Burlington (Plains Rd W.)
 Hamilton (640 Queenston Rd)
 Kitchener (700 Strasburg Road at Block Line Road in Forest Glen Shopping Centre)
 London (4465 Wellington Road)
 Niagara Falls (6777 Morrison St)
 North Bay (Hwy 11 north @ McKewan)
 Oakville (Towers store 41) Trafalgar Rd., Oakville, Ontario (Trafalgar Rd. & Leighland Ave. area)
 Ottawa (Hazeldean Mall)
 Ottawa (Shoppers City West)
 Ottawa (Cyrville Rd store #42)
 Owen Sound
 Peterborough (950 Lansdowne St W)
 St. Catharines (366 Bunting Rd @ Carlton St)
 Stratford (now at site of Festival Marketplace Mall - 1067 Ontario Street)
 Sudbury (40 Elm St, inside City Centre Mall)
 Waterloo (70 Bridgeport E. at Erb Street in Towers Plaza); became Zellers in 1991 and later Walmart.

Welland: 1000 East Main Street.
Currently: Canadian Tire Financial Services Limited

 Woodstock (currently Goodlife location)

Greater Toronto Area

 Brampton (Towers store 46) 400 Queen St. W., Brampton, Ontario (later moved to Kingsport Plaza, Main St. N. (Main St. N. & Williams Pkwy area) )
 Bridlewood Mall (Towers store 59) 2900 Warden Ave., Toronto, (Scarborough) Ontario (Warden Ave. & Finch Ave. E. area)
 Dixie Plaza (Towers store 26) 3100 Dixie Rd., Toronto (Mississauga) Ontario (Dixie Rd. & Dundas St. E. area)
 High Park (Towers store 22) 2290 Dundas St. W., Toronto, Ontario (Dundas St. W. & Bloor St. W. area)
 Jane & Finch Mall (Towers store 38), 3929 Jane St., Toronto (North York) Ontario (Jane St. & Finch Ave. W. area)
 Kipling & The Queensway (Towers store 53) 1255 The Queensway, Toronto (Etobicoke) Ontario (Kipling Ave. & The Queensway area)
 Midland Lawrence Plaza (Towers store 21) 2650 Lawrence Ave. E., Toronto (Scarborough) Ontario (Lawrence Ave. E. & Midland Ave. area)
 Rexdale Mall (Towers store 43) 2267 Islington Ave., Toronto, (Etobicoke) Ontario (Islington Ave., & Rexdale Blvd. area)
 Riverdale Plaza (Towers store 30) 449 Carlaw Ave, Toronto, Ontario (Carlaw Ave. & Gerrard St. E. area)
 The Galleria Mall (Towers store 47) 1245 Dupont St., Toronto, Ontario (Dufferin St. & Dupont St. area)
 Westside Mall (Towers store 34) 2400 Eglinton Ave. W., Toronto (York) Ontario (Eglinton Ave. W. & Keele St. area)
 Westwood Mall (Towers store 60) 7205 Goreway Dr., Mississauga (Malton) Ontario (Goreway Dr. & Morning Star Dr. area)

Prince Edward Island
 Charlottetown (Charlottetown Mall)
 Summerside

See also
 List of Canadian department stores

References

External links
   Towers Department Stores website

Department stores of Canada
Defunct retail companies of Canada
Hudson's Bay Company
Retail companies established in 1960
Retail companies disestablished in 1991
Canadian companies disestablished in 1991
Canadian companies established in 1960